Hansford is an unincorporated community in Kanawha County, West Virginia, United States. Hansford is located along the Kanawha River and West Virginia Route 61, adjacent to Pratt. Hansford has a post office with ZIP code 25103.

History
The Hansford post office was originally named Paintcreek. Paintcreek was the original name of the community now called Hansford. The present name most likely came from a local family named Hansford.

References

Unincorporated communities in Kanawha County, West Virginia
Unincorporated communities in West Virginia
Populated places on the Kanawha River
Coal towns in West Virginia